In the United Kingdom, a scheduled monument is a 'nationally important' archaeological site or historic building, given protection against unauthorised change. The various pieces of legislation used for legally protecting heritage assets from damage and destruction are grouped under the term ‘designation’. The protection given to scheduled monuments is given under the Ancient Monuments and Archaeological Areas Act 1979, which is a different law from that used for listed buildings (which fall within the town and country planning system). A heritage asset is a part of the historic environment that is valued because of its historic, archaeological, architectural or artistic interest. These are judged to be important enough to have extra legal protection through designation.

There are about 20,000 scheduled monuments in England representing about 37,000 heritage assets. Of the tens of thousands of scheduled monuments in the UK, most are inconspicuous archaeological sites, but some are large ruins. According to the 1979 Act, a monument cannot be a structure which is occupied as a dwelling, used as a place of worship or protected under the Protection of Wrecks Act 1973. A protected historic asset that is occupied would be designated as a listed building.

England
 Scheduled monuments in Bedfordshire
 Scheduled monuments in Berkshire
 Scheduled monuments in Bristol
 Scheduled monuments in Buckinghamshire
 Scheduled monuments in Cambridgeshire
 Scheduled monuments in Cheshire
 List of scheduled monuments in Cheshire dated to before 1066
 List of scheduled monuments in Cheshire (1066–1539)
 List of scheduled monuments in Cheshire since 1539
 Scheduled monuments in Cornwall
 Scheduled monuments in Cumbria
 Scheduled monuments in Derbyshire
 Scheduled monuments in Amber Valley
 Scheduled monuments in Bolsover
 Scheduled monuments in Chesterfield
 Scheduled monuments in Derbyshire Dales
 Scheduled monuments in the Borough of Erewash
 Scheduled monuments in High Peak
 Scheduled monuments in North East Derbyshire
 Scheduled monuments in South Derbyshire
 Scheduled monuments in Devon
 Scheduled monuments and listed buildings in Exeter
 Scheduled monuments in Dorset
 Scheduled monuments in County Durham
 Scheduled monuments in East Sussex
 Scheduled monuments in Essex
 Scheduled monuments in Gloucestershire
 Scheduled monuments in Greater London
 Scheduled monuments in Greater Manchester
 Scheduled monuments in Hampshire
 Scheduled monuments in Herefordshire
 Scheduled monuments in Hertfordshire
 Scheduled monuments in Kent
 Scheduled monuments in Maidstone
 Scheduled monuments in Lancashire
 Scheduled monuments in Leicestershire
 Scheduled monuments in Leicester
 Scheduled monuments in Lincolnshire
 List of scheduled monuments in South Kesteven
 Scheduled monuments in Merseyside
 Scheduled monuments in Norfolk
 Scheduled monuments in North Yorkshire
 Scheduled monuments in Northamptonshire
 Scheduled monuments in Northumberland
 Scheduled monuments in Nottinghamshire
 Scheduled monuments in Oxfordshire
 Scheduled monuments in Shropshire
 Scheduled monuments in Somerset
 Scheduled monuments in Bath and North East Somerset
 List of scheduled monuments in Mendip
 List of scheduled monuments in North Somerset
 List of scheduled monuments in Sedgemoor
 List of scheduled monuments in South Somerset
 List of scheduled monuments in Taunton Deane
 List of scheduled monuments in West Somerset
 Scheduled monuments in South Yorkshire
 Scheduled monuments in Staffordshire
 Scheduled monuments in Suffolk
 Scheduled monuments in Surrey
 Scheduled monuments in Tyne and Wear
 Scheduled monuments in Warwickshire
 Scheduled monuments in the West Midlands
 Scheduled monuments in Birmingham
 Scheduled monuments in Coventry
 Scheduled monuments in West Sussex
 Scheduled monuments in West Yorkshire
 Scheduled monuments in Wiltshire
 Scheduled monuments in Worcestershire

Northern Ireland
 List of scheduled monuments in Northern Ireland

Scotland

 Scheduled monuments in Aberdeen
 Scheduled monuments in Aberdeenshire
 Scheduled monuments in Angus
 Scheduled monuments in Argyll and Bute
 Scheduled monuments in Clackmannanshire
 Scheduled monuments in Dumfries and Galloway
 Scheduled monuments in Dundee
 Scheduled monuments in East Ayrshire
 Scheduled monuments in East Lothian
 Scheduled monuments in East Renfrewshire
 Scheduled monuments in Edinburgh
 Scheduled monuments in Falkirk
 Scheduled monuments in Fife
 Scheduled monuments in Glasgow
 Scheduled monuments in Highland
 Scheduled monuments in Midlothian
 Scheduled monuments in Moray
 Scheduled monuments in Comhairle nan Eilean Siar
 Scheduled monuments in North Ayrshire
 Scheduled monuments in Orkney
 Scheduled monuments in Perth and Kinross
 Scheduled monuments in Renfrewshire
 Scheduled monuments in the Scottish Borders
 Scheduled monuments in Shetland
 Scheduled monuments in South Ayrshire
 Scheduled monuments in South Lanarkshire
 Scheduled monuments in Stirling
 Scheduled monuments in West Lothian

Wales

 Scheduled monuments in Wales

References

Scheduled monuments
List
list